Mahabali Singh Kushwaha(born 20 April 1955) is an Indian politician belonging to Bhabua, Kaimur district, Bihar. He was a member of the Indian Parliament, representing Karakat.

Mahabali Singh twice represented Chainpur seat in Bihar Legislative Assembly as a member of the Bahujan Samaj Party. During his second tenure, he defected to Rashtriya Janata Dal of Lalu Prasad Yadav and became the PWD minister in the government led by Rabri Devi in 2002.

Later, Singh joined Janata Dal (United), led by Nitish Kumar, and won the Chainpur seat in the 2005 and 2006 assembly elections.

In 2009, Singh won Karakat parliamentary constituency as a JD(U) candidate. He lost the seat to Upendra Kushwaha of the Rashtriya Lok Samata Party in 2014 and in 2019 he regained it from Kushwaha.

Life and career
Mahabali Singh was born in Khiri village, Bhagwanpur District in Kaimur region of Bihar. Between 1995-2009, he has served as the Member of Bihar Legislative Assembly four times. In 2003-2004, Singh took charge under Bihar Government as Cabinet Minister, PWD. In 2004-2005, he was further appointed Cabinet Minister for Food & Civil Supplies in Bihar Government. Singh contested 2009 Lok Sabha elections and was elected to 15th Lok Sabha. On 31 August 2009, he was appointed a member of Committee on Defence. He was again appointed Member of Committee on Ethics and Committee on Power of Lok Sabha respectively. Singh also took keen interest in organisational works and has published Gautam Budhha, Ambedkar and Jagdev Vichar Manch. He likes football, cricket, and folk dramas. In his capacity as Lok Sabha member, he has visited Malaysia, Singapore, and Thailand.

References

1955 births
Living people
India MPs 2009–2014
Lok Sabha members from Bihar
People from Kaimur district
Janata Dal (United) politicians
India MPs 2019–present
Bahujan Samaj Party politicians
Rashtriya Janata Dal politicians

External links
Karakat Election Results 2019: JD-U candidate Mahabali Singh has won with a margin of 84542 votes